Pat Rizzo (November 30, 1941 – April 15, 2021) was an American saxophonist and flautist, best known for his work with funk band Sly and the Family Stone.

Career
Rizzo started performing in the sixties with The Cuff Links. He is best known for his work as saxophonist and flautist  with funk band Sly and the Family Stone. He was intended as a replacement for founding member Jerry Martini, who got into trouble with Sly Stone and his accountants for inquiring about money rightfully due to him, but both Martini and Rizzo remained in the band and became good friends. He later replaced Charles Miller in War. During this period he also performed with Tito Puente and Frank Sinatra.

Rizzo appeared on Ry Cooder's 1976 album Chicken Skin Music, 1977 live album Show Time and his 1978 album Jazz  and he accompanied Cooder on his 1977 tour of Europe.

Compositions
Rizzo is credited as composer of the Sly and the Family Stone song, "Ha Ha Hee Hee". During the recording sessions for the band's Small Talk album, Rizzo co-wrote the song with Jerry Martini.

Personal life
Rizzo was married to Kelli J Ball (Mickeliunas), an international fashion model. The couple divorced. He died in April 2021 at the age of 79.

References

External links
Pat Rizzo Interview - NAMM Oral History Library (2016)

1941 births
2021 deaths
21st-century saxophonists
American funk saxophonists
American male saxophonists
American people of Italian descent
American soul musicians
Sly and the Family Stone members
War (American band) members